51983 Hönig, provisional designation , is a Hildian asteroid from the outermost regions of the asteroid belt, approximately 13 kilometers in diameter. It was discovered on 19 September 2001, by astronomers Charles Juels and Paulo Holvorcem at the Fountain Hills Observatory in Arizona, United States. The asteroid was named after German astronomer Sebastian Hönig.

Orbit and classification 

Hönig is a member of the Hilda family, a collisional asteroid family of carbonaceous asteroids within the larger dynamical Hilda group. It orbits the Sun in the outermost region of the main belt at a distance of 3.5–4.4 AU once every 7 years and 11 months (2,881 days). Its orbit has an eccentricity of 0.12 and an inclination of 9° with respect to the ecliptic.

The body's observation arc begins at Palomar Observatory in September 1954, on precovery images found by the Digitized Sky Survey.

Physical characteristics 

The asteroid's spectral type is unknown. The Hilda family's overall spectral type is that of a carbonaceous C-type.

Diameter and albedo 

Hönig has not been observed by any space-based telescope such as the Infrared Astronomical Satellite IRAS, the Japanese Akari satellite or the NEOWISE mission of NASA's Wide-field Infrared Survey Explorer. Based on an assumed albedo of 0.06 – derived from the parent body of the Hilda family, 153 Hilda, which is also typical for carbonaceous asteroids – Hönig measures 13 kilometers in diameter for an absolute magnitude of 13.2.

Rotation period 

As of 2017, no rotational lightcurve of Hönig has been obtained from photometric observations. The body's rotation period, pole axis and shape remain unknown.

Naming 

This minor planet was named after German astronomer Sebastian F. Hönig (born 1978), a prolific discoverer of minor planets and several comets, including the hyperbolic comet C/2002 O4, which disintegrated shortly after its discovery in 2002. The official naming citation was published by the Minor Planet Center on 7 January 2004.

References

External links 
 Asteroid Lightcurve Database (LCDB), query form (info )
 Dictionary of Minor Planet Names, Google books
 Asteroids and comets rotation curves, CdR – Observatoire de Genève, Raoul Behrend
 Discovery Circumstances: Numbered Minor Planets (50001)-(55000) – Minor Planet Center
 
 

051983
Discoveries by Charles W. Juels
Discoveries by Paulo R. Holvorcem
Named minor planets
20010919